John Rice Carter (born November 6, 1941) is the U.S. representative serving  since 2003. He is a Republican. The district includes the northern suburbs of Austin, as well as Fort Hood.

Early life, education, and career
Carter was born in Houston, but has spent most of his life in central Texas. He graduated from Texas Tech University with a degree in history in 1964, and earned a law degree from the University of Texas School of Law in 1969.

After graduating from law school, Carter served as the first general counsel to the Texas House of Representatives' Agriculture Committee. He later began a private law practice in Round Rock.

In 1981, Carter was appointed as judge of the 277th District Court of Williamson County. He was elected to the post a year later, the first Republican elected to a countywide position in the county. He was reelected four times.

U.S. House of Representatives

Elections
Carter retired from the bench in 2001 to run for Congress in the newly created 31st District. After finishing second in the Republican primary, he defeated Peter Wareing in the runoff, which was tantamount to election in what was then a heavily Republican district.

For his first term, 2003–05, Carter represented a district that stretched from the suburbs of Austin to far western Houston, and included College Station, home of Texas A&M University. From the 2003 Texas redistricting until 2013, Carter represented a district stretching from the fringes of the Dallas–Fort Worth Metroplex through more rural portions of Central Texas. Redistricting after the 2010 census, which first affected the 2013–15 term, reduced the 31st to Bell and Williamson counties. The 31st now includes Fort Hood, home of the U.S. Army's 3rd Cavalry Regiment and the 1st Cavalry Division.

In 2016, Carter was reelected with 166,060 votes (58.4%) over Democratic nominee Mike Clark and Libertarian Scott Ballard, who received 103,852 (34.5%) and 14,676 (5.2%), respectively.

In 2018, Carter defeated Democratic nominee MJ Hegar with 144,680 votes (50.6%) to her 136,362 (47.7%). It was the smallest victory margin of his career.

Tenure 
Carter was the sponsor of the Identity Theft Penalty Enhancement Act, which George W. Bush signed into law in 2004.

In the 110th Congress, Carter sponsored and co-sponsored a number of bills, including the Military Spouses Residency Relief Act, the Terrorist Death Penalty Act of 2008, and a bill condemning the vandalism of the Vietnam War Memorial on the National Mall.

On June 12, 2009, Carter co-sponsored H.R. 1503, which would require the production of a birth certificate from presidential candidates. The bill was introduced as a result of conspiracy theories that claimed that President Barack Obama is not a natural-born U.S. citizen.

On September 15, 2009, in an opinion piece published in The Hill, Carter called the 111th Congress a "house of hypocrisy" after the House of Representatives voted to rebuke Representative Joe Wilson for an outburst but would not go after Representative and House Ways and Means Chair Charlie Rangel, who had been the subject of numerous ethical problems involving taxes and property. Carter is also a proponent of the "Rangel Rule," where IRS penalties and interest would be eliminated if one paid back taxes, similar to the treatment Rangel, Treasury Secretary Timothy Geithner, and former Senator (and onetime Secretary of Health and Human Services nominee) Tom Daschle received after their tax problems were publicized.

Carter introduced a "Privileged Resolution" that would have forced Rangel's resignation as chair of the Ways and Means Committee after he declined to resign voluntarily, citing the inaction of the House Democratic Caucus and the ongoing investigations as reasons. The resolution failed largely along party lines, with two Democrats and six Republicans breaking ranks.

Carter amended his financial disclosure forms in October 2009 to list nearly $300,000 in capital gains from the sale of ExxonMobil stock in 2006 and 2007. Though he listed the sale of the assets, he did not list the actual amount of capital gains, on which he did pay taxes.

On November 16, 2009, Carter introduced legislation to give combatant casualty status to the victims of the 2009 Fort Hood shooting, similar to those who were killed in Afghanistan and Iraq.

In 2015, Carter cosponsored a resolution to amend the US constitution to ban same-sex marriage.

On May 16, 2018, Carter was named the new chair of the Military Construction and Veterans Affairs Subcommittee on Appropriations after Charlie Dent retired. He had previously chaired the Homeland Security Subcommittee on Appropriations.

Carter co-sponsored H.R. 4760, the Securing America's Future Act of 2018, which failed to pass the House.

On December 18, 2019, Carter voted against both articles of impeachment against Trump. Of the 195 Republicans who voted, all voted against both impeachment articles.

On January 6, 2021, Carter voted against certifying the results of the 2020 presidential election based on spurious allegations of voter fraud.

Committee assignments 
Committee on Appropriations
Subcommittee on Military Construction, Veterans Affairs, and Related Agencies (Ranking Member)
Subcommittee on Defense

Party leadership and caucus memberships
 House Army Caucus (Co-Chair)
 House Republican Conference (Secretary)
United States Congressional International Conservation Caucus
 Republican Steering Committee
 Sportsmen's Caucus
 Tea Party Caucus
 Congressional Cement Caucus
 I-14 Caucus
Republican Study Committee

Electoral history 
Carter was reelected to his twelve term in Congress in 2022.

|-
| colspan=13 |
|-
!Year
!Winning candidate
!Party
!Pct
!Opponent
!Party
!Pct
|-
|2002
| style="background:#ffb3b3;"| John Carter
| style="background:#ffb3b3;"|Republican
| style="background:#ffb3b3;"| 69.1%
| style="background:#b3d9ff;"| David Bagley
| style="background:#b3d9ff;"|Democratic
| style="background:#b3d9ff;"| 27.4%
|-
|2004
| style="background:#ffb3b3;"| John Carter (inc.)
| style="background:#ffb3b3;"|Republican
| style="background:#ffb3b3;"| 64.8%
| style="background:#b3d9ff;"| Jon Porter
| style="background:#b3d9ff;"|Democratic
| style="background:#b3d9ff;"| 32.5%
|-
|2006
| style="background:#ffb3b3;"| John Carter (inc.)
| style="background:#ffb3b3;"|Republican
| style="background:#ffb3b3;"| 58.5%
| style="background:#b3d9ff;"| Mary Beth Herrell
| style="background:#b3d9ff;"|Democratic
| style="background:#b3d9ff;"| 38.8%
|-
|2008
| style="background:#ffb3b3;"|John Carter (inc.)
| style="background:#ffb3b3;"|Republican
| style="background:#ffb3b3;"| 60.3%
| style="background:#b3d9ff;"| Brian Ruiz
| style="background:#b3d9ff;"|Democratic
| style="background:#b3d9ff;"| 36.6%
|-
||2010
| style="background:#ffb3b3;"| John Carter (inc.)
| style="background:#ffb3b3;"|Republican
| style="background:#ffb3b3;"| 82.5%
| style="background:#fc9;"| Bill Oliver
| style="background:#fc9;"|Libertarian
| style="background:#fc9;"| 17.5%
|-
||2012
| style="background:#ffb3b3;"| John Carter (inc.)
| style="background:#ffb3b3;"|Republican
| style="background:#ffb3b3;"| 61.3%
| style="background:#b3d9ff;"| Stephen Wyman
| style="background:#b3d9ff;"|Democratic
| style="background:#b3d9ff;"| 35%
|-
||2014
| style="background:#ffb3b3;"| John Carter (inc.)
| style="background:#ffb3b3;"|Republican
| style="background:#ffb3b3;"| 64%
| style="background:#b3d9ff;"| Louie Minor
| style="background:#b3d9ff;"|Democratic
| style="background:#b3d9ff;"| 32%
|-
||2016
| style="background:#ffb3b3;"| John Carter (inc.)
| style="background:#ffb3b3;"|Republican
| style="background:#ffb3b3;"| 58.4%
| style="background:#b3d9ff;"| Mike Clark
| style="background:#b3d9ff;"|Democratic
| style="background:#b3d9ff;"| 36.5%
|-
||2018
| style="background:#ffb3b3;"| John Carter (inc.)
| style="background:#ffb3b3;"|Republican
| style="background:#ffb3b3;"| 50.6%
| style="background:#b3d9ff;"|Mary Jennings Hegar
| style="background:#b3d9ff;"|Democratic
| style="background:#b3d9ff;"| 47.7%
|-
||2020
| style="background:#ffb3b3;"| John Carter (inc.)
| style="background:#ffb3b3;"|Republican
| style="background:#ffb3b3;"| 53.5%
| style="background:#b3d9ff;"| Donna Imam
| style="background:#b3d9ff;"|Democratic
| style="background:#b3d9ff;"| 44.3%
|-
||2022
| style="background:#ffb3b3;"| John Carter (inc.)
| style="background:#ffb3b3;"|Republican
| style="background:#ffb3b3;"| 100%
| style="background:#b3d9ff;"| None
| style="background:#b3d9ff;"| 
| style="background:#b3d9ff;"|

Personal life
Carter married his wife, Erika, in 1968. They have four children and six grandchildren. Since 1971, they have lived in Round Rock, Texas.

References

External links
 Congressman John Carter official U.S. House website
 John Carter for Congress
 
 
 

|-

|-

1941 births
21st-century American politicians
Activists from Texas
American Lutherans
Bellaire High School (Bellaire, Texas) alumni
Living people
Lutherans from Texas
People from Round Rock, Texas
Protestants from Texas
Republican Party members of the United States House of Representatives from Texas
Tea Party movement activists
Texas state court judges
Texas Tech University alumni